Avington may refer to:
Avington, Berkshire
Avington, Hampshire

See also
Abington (disambiguation)